Metaporus is a genus of beetles in the family Dytiscidae, containing the following species:

 Metaporus meridionalis (Aubé, 1838)
 Metaporus orientalis Toledo & Hosseinie, 2003

References

Dytiscidae